Francis Osborne Riviere (1932 – 23 November 2017) was Foreign Minister of Dominica. He became the foreign minister in 2001, replacing the prime minister, Pierre Charles. He acted as Prime Minister, after Pierre Charles' s death. He had previously been trade minister.

He acted as Prime Minister after the death of Pierre Charles until Roosevelt Skerrit assumed the Prime Ministership two days later. He decided to retire from active politics following the 2005 General Election. Riviere served as a member of the Dominica Labour Party. He died on 23 November 2017, aged 85.

References

1932 births
2017 deaths
Dominica Labour Party politicians
Foreign ministers of Dominica
Prime Ministers of Dominica
Members of the House of Assembly of Dominica
21st-century Dominica politicians